Åkerby-Lopperstad is a village in the municipality Borgholm on the island Öland and the province Kalmar län in Sweden. The village had 73 inhabitants in 2010.

References

Populated places in Borgholm Municipality